Jan Izydor Rybkowski (4 April 1912 – 29 December 1987) was a Polish film director. He directed 30 films between 1949 and 1984. His 1961 film Tonight a City Will Die was entered into the 2nd Moscow International Film Festival. Two years later, he was a member of the jury at the 3rd Moscow International Film Festival.

Selected filmography
 Warsaw Premiere (1951)
 Nikodem Dyzma (1956)
 Kapelusz pana Anatola (1957)
 Pan Anatol szuka miliona (1958)
 Inspekcja pana Anatola (1959)
 Tonight a City Will Die (1961)
 Spotkanie w "Bajce" aka Meeting in the Fable (1962)
 Chłopi (TV series) (1972)
 The Peasants (1973)
 Gniazdo (1974)
 Rodzina Połanieckich (TV series) (1978)
 Kariera Nikodema Dyzmy (TV series) (1980)

References

External links

1912 births
1987 deaths
Polish film directors
People from Ostrowiec Świętokrzyski
20th-century Polish screenwriters
Male screenwriters
20th-century Polish male writers